The 1998–99 UC Irvine Anteaters men's basketball team is a team that represented the University of California, Irvine during the 1998–99 NCAA Division I men's basketball season. It was led by 2nd-year head coach Pat Douglass, the Anteaters played at the Bren Events Center. At the time, the team was part of the Big West Conference.

Previous season 
In head coach Pat Douglass' first year, the 1997–98 UC Irvine Anteaters men's basketball team finished the season with a record of 9–18; 6–10 in Big West play.

Roster

Team Leaders:

Scoring: Jerry Green - 12.9 per game

Redounding: Marek Ondera - 7.0 per game

Assists: Jerry Green - 3.8 per game

Steals: Jerry Green - 1.5 per game

Schedule

|-
!colspan=9 style=|Non-Conference Season

|-
!colspan=9 style=|Conference Season

Source

Awards and honors
Jerry Green
Big West Freshman of the Year 
Big West All-Freshman Team

Source

References

UC Irvine Anteaters men's basketball seasons
UC Irvine
UC Irvine Anteaters
UC Irvine Anteaters